Chikao (written: 周夫, 親生 or 千禾夫) is a masculine Japanese given name. People with this name include:

, Japanese playwright and dramatist
, Japanese voice actor
, Japanese musician, former member of The Stalin

Japanese masculine given names